Cui Min (born 6 July 1989 in Wangqing County, Yanbian) is a Chinese of Korean descent, former footballer who played as defender or defensive midfielder for Yanbian FC, Chongqing Lifan and Shenzhen FC throughout his playing career.

Club career
Cui Min started his professional football career in 2010 when he was promoted to second tier football club Yanbian FC's first team squad. On 15 February 2011, Cui moved to China League One side Chongqing Lifan. After three seasons with Chongqing on 2 July 2013, Cui returned to Yanbian FC. His return would see him establish himself as a vital member of the team and by the end of the 2015 China League One campaign he would win the division title with Yanbian. On 5 March 2016, Cui made his Super League debut in the first match of 2016 season against Shanghai Shenhua in a game that ended in a 1-1 draw.

On 23 January 2017, Cui transferred to League One side Shenzhen FC. He would make his debut for the club on 12 March 2017 in a league game against Dalian Transcendence F.C. that ended in a 6-0 victory. The following season he would go on to aid the team gain promotion to the top tier when the club came runners-up within the league at the end of the 2018 China League One campaign.

In his return to the Chinese Super League, on 2 March 2019 against Hebei China Fortune he tore his thigh muscle in a 3-1 victory. Initially he would only miss three weeks before he return back into the team from the injury, however the severity of the damage would ultimately see him miss the rest of the season. The following campaign Cui would have difficulty getting opportunities in the team and be moved to the reserves. After plans to be loaned out did not materialise, Cui would decide to retire from playing after his contract with Shenzhen finished.

International career
On 14 January 2017, Cui made his debut for Chinese national team in the third-place playoff of 2017 China Cup against Croatia.

Career statistics
Statistics accurate as of match played 31 December 2021.

Honours

Club
Yanbian FC
 China League One: 2015

References

External links
 
 

1989 births
Living people
Chinese footballers
People from Wangqing County
Yanbian Funde F.C. players
Chongqing Liangjiang Athletic F.C. players
Shenzhen F.C. players
Chinese Super League players
China League One players
Chinese people of Korean descent
China international footballers
Association football defenders